The discography of Information Society, an American synthpop/freestyle band founded by Kurt Harland and Paul Robb in 1982.

Albums

Studio albums

Live albums
 It Is Useless to Resist Us: Information Society Live (2013)

Extended plays
 The InSoc EP (1983)
 Creatures of Influence (1984)
 Oscillator (2007)
 Modulator (2009)
 Land of the Blind (2014)
Brothers! Sisters! (2016)

Compilations
 InSoc Recombinant (1999)
 strange haircuts // cardboard guitars // and computer samples (2001)
 Pure Energy (2004)
 Apocryphon: Electro Roots 1982-1985 (2008)
 Energize! Classic Remixes, Vol. 1 (2011)
 Engage! Classic Remixes, Vol. 2 (2014)
 Encode! Classic Remixes, Vol. 3 (2015)

Singles

Music videos 

 Fall in Line (1983)
 What's on Your Mind (Pure Energy) (1988)
 Walking Away (1988)
 Repetition (1989)
 Think (1990)
 How Long (1991)
 Peace and Love, Inc (1992)
 I Like the Way You Werk It (2007)
 Great Big Disco World (2007)
 Me and My Rhythm Box (2014)
 Jonestown (2014)
 Where Were You (2014)
 The Prize (2014)
 Beautiful World (feat. Gerald V. Casale) (2014)
 Creatures of Light & Darkness (2014)
 Above and Below (2014)
 Let it Burn (2014)
 Land of the Blind (2014)
 Get Back (2014)
Nothing Prevails (2018)

Video albums
 It Is Useless To Resist Us: 25 Years Of Information Society (2009)

References

Discographies of American artists
Electronic music discographies
New wave discographies